Bonnibel Butler was an early 20th century children's book illustrator.  She also provided designs and illustrations for magazines, like St. Nicholas.

Career 
Butler worked for the P. F. Volland Company.  She illustrated William Mac Harg's Let's Pretend, Some Adventures of the Golden Age of Nursery Land, which was published by Volland in 1914.

Selected publications 
Butler, Bonnibel. The Baby's Record of Mental and Physical Growth and Her Horoscope. Chicago: Published by M.A. Donohue & Co, 1913.  
Mac Harg, William with ill. by Butler Let's Pretend, Some Adventures of the Golden Age of Nursery Land P. F. Volland, 1914. 
Rice, Wallace, and Frances Rice with decorations by Butler. Cupids & Kisses; A Book of Delights. [Chicago]: M.A. Donohue & Co, 1914.  
Butler, Bonnibel. Mother Goose favorites. Chicago; New York: M.A. Dohohue & Co., 1930. 
Smith, Mary Estella, and Bonnibel Butler. Holland Stories. New York: Rand, McNally, 1932.

References 

American children's book illustrators
American women illustrators
Year of birth missing
Year of death missing
Place of birth missing
Place of death missing
20th-century American women artists